Javier Osvaldo Mendoza (born 2 September 1992) is an Argentine professional footballer who plays as a winger for AEL Limassol.

Career
Mendoza started his career in 2013 with Gimnasia y Esgrima of Primera B Nacional, appearing on the bench five times during 2012–13. His debut came in the Copa Argentina, in a defeat against Excursionistas. His first league appearance came during the 2013–14 Primera División season, after Gimnasia's promotion, in a loss to Racing. Sixty-nine appearances and four goals followed throughout the next four seasons with Gimnasia. Ahead of 2016–17, Mendoza joined fellow top-flight side Atlético Tucumán on loan. On 28 August 2016, Mendoza made his Atlético Tucumán debut against Atlético de Rafaela in a 1–0 win.

A year later, Mendoza joined newly-promoted Chacarita Juniors. He made his debut on 10 September versus Tigre, before scoring his first Chacarita goal on 17 September against his former club Atlético Tucumán. Mendoza terminated his contract with Chacarita on 9 January 2018, prior to signing for Instituto a day later. His 100th career appearance came against Sarmiento on 6 May. Huracán of the Primera División signed Mendoza in January 2019.

On 3 August 2020, Mendoza joined Super League Greece club Panetolikos F.C. on a two years' contract for an undisclosed fee.

Career statistics
.

References

External links
 

1992 births
Living people
Sportspeople from Salta Province
Argentine footballers
Association football midfielders
Primera Nacional players
Argentine Primera División players
Super League Greece players
Club de Gimnasia y Esgrima La Plata footballers
Atlético Tucumán footballers
Chacarita Juniors footballers
Instituto footballers
Club Atlético Huracán footballers
Panetolikos F.C. players
Ionikos F.C. players
AEL Limassol players
Argentine expatriate footballers
Expatriate footballers in Greece
Argentine expatriate sportspeople in Greece
Expatriate footballers in Cyprus
Argentine expatriate sportspeople in Cyprus